François Benjamin Levrault (7 August 1774 - 3 October 1855) was a French politician. A doctor, he was depute for the Charente department from 1831 to 1834, serving in the majority supporting the ministries of the July Monarchy.

Sources 
 

1774 births
1855 deaths
People from Charente
Politicians from Nouvelle-Aquitaine
Orléanists
Members of the 2nd Chamber of Deputies of the July Monarchy